Eliza Standerwick Gregory or Eliza Standerwick Barnes (6 December 1840 – 22 March 1932) was a British botanist.

Life
Eliza Standerwick Barnes was born in Thrapston in Northamptonshire in 1840. She was always interested in botany but she did not become a published botanist until she was older at the age of 64. Her special knowledge was of violets and she published a monograph in 1912. Her botanical abbreviation is from her married name and is "Greg." She published several times in the Journal of Botany.

Gregory is credited with the discovery of the Cornish fumitory, Fumaria occidentalis. She reported that she found it on the edge of a wood at Lelant.

Gregory died in Weston-super-Mare. Her herbarium is in the Natural History Museum.  It includes samples from southern England and from Northern Ireland.

References

1840 births
1932 deaths
People from Thrapston